George Clay Ginty (February 14, 1840December 9, 1890) was a Canadian American immigrant, politician, and journalist.  A Republican, he was elected to one term each in the Wisconsin State Senate and Assembly and was founder of the Green Bay Gazette which still operates today as the Green Bay Press-Gazette—the main local paper of Green Bay, Wisconsin. He also served as a Union Army officer in the American Civil War and a United States Marshal near the end of his life.

Biography
Ginty was born in Toronto, Ontario in 1840. He moved with his parents to Racine, Wisconsin in 1853. In 1859, he moved to Oconto, Wisconsin. Ginty later moved to Green Bay, Wisconsin and Chippewa Falls, Wisconsin. He died in Madison, Wisconsin on December 9, 1890. At the time of his death, he was a member of the United States Marshals Service, acting as Marshal of the Western District of Wisconsin.

Newspaper career
Ginty founded the Oconto Pioneer in 1859 and served as editor and publisher of the paper until 1865. In 1866, he founded the Green Bay Gazette and in 1868, he founded the Chippewa Falls Herald. He later served as editor and publisher of the Herald from 1870 to 1890. From 1875 to 1878, Ginty was president of the Wisconsin Editorial Association.

Military career
Ginty joined the Union Army in 1864 during the American Civil War as major of the 39th Wisconsin Volunteer Infantry Regiment on June 3, 1864. He was mustered out of the volunteers on September 22, 1864. He rejoined the army on February 23, 1865, as colonel of the 47th Wisconsin Volunteer Infantry Regiment. He was mustered out of the volunteers after this service on September 4, 1865. On January 13, 1866, President Andrew Johnson nominated Ginty for appointment to the grade of brevet brigadier general of volunteers to rank from September 28, 1865, and the United States Senate confirmed the appointment on March 12, 1866.

Political career
Ginty was a member of the Wisconsin State Assembly in 1863 and the Wisconsin State Senate from 1884 to 1888. He was a Republican.

References

Further reading

External links

|-

|-

Politicians from Toronto
Politicians from Racine, Wisconsin
People from Oconto, Wisconsin
Politicians from Green Bay, Wisconsin
Politicians from Chippewa Falls, Wisconsin
Republican Party Wisconsin state senators
Republican Party members of the Wisconsin State Assembly
People of Wisconsin in the American Civil War
Union Army colonels
19th-century American newspaper founders
19th-century American newspaper publishers (people)
Editors of Wisconsin newspapers
United States Marshals
1840 births
1890 deaths
19th-century American journalists
American male journalists
Journalists from Toronto
Writers from Green Bay, Wisconsin
Writers from Racine, Wisconsin
Writers from Toronto
19th-century American male writers
19th-century American politicians
Pre-Confederation Canadian emigrants to the United States